Bathai is a village in Darbhanga district, Bihar, India. It is on the bank of the Kamla Balan River

According to the 2011 census it has a population of 3664 living in 608 households.

It has a rich cultural history.
1 Middle and high school is in the east of village.

The main castes in the village are Brahmin 

The language spoken in village is Maithili.

Almost 50% of the population of Bathai are in Delhi and Mumbai due to unemployment.

References

Villages in Darbhanga district